Salam Kamel Karam (born 9 March 1975) is a Swedish journalist.

Salam Karam was born in Baghdad in Iraq. He speaks fluent Arabic as well as Swedish. He has a bachelor's degree in Middle-Eastern studies from Uppsala University. He has worked as a Middle East reporter for the newspaper Svenska Dagbladet and in the radio program Godmorgon, världen!. He has been noted for writing several articles exposing religious extremism and antisemitism among Sweden's Muslims.

References

1975 births
Living people
Swedish journalists
Uppsala University alumni
Writers from Baghdad
Iraqi emigrants to Sweden